Opinga (Gheg Albanian: Apânga) are traditional shoes worn by Albanians in Albania, Kosovo, North Macedonia (opinci), Montenegro, Greece (by the Arvanites), and the Arbëresh villages of Italy. They were also worn by countrymen in Romania (opinca), Serbia, Croatia, Bosnia and Herzegovina (opanak), Bulgaria (opinka), and other countries. They are made of a single leather skin, formed to the feet with leather or wool strips. A southern Albanian variety of opinga are the typical turned up leather shoes with red and black wool pompoms on the ends, which are often used for folk dances.

Etymology
According to the most recent statement on Albanology by Matzinger, the word "opingë" derives from Proto-Albanian  "*api + *ga", *api also giving rise to hap (“step”). Related to hap (“open”)

History

The earliest archaeological evidence for opinga dates back to the 5-4th centuries BC, indicating they were an element in Illyrian culture. Later evidence of their use in Albania is apparent in the works of 16th century iconographic painter Onufri.

It has been suggested that the etymology of the word comes from Proto-Albanian *api (modern ), meaning "step".

In 1610 Marino Bizzi, a Venetian patrician in Dalmatia and Archbishop of Antivari, noted that the men of Mirdita wore opinga, made of cow skin, prepared by the men themselves.

The artisans of the kaza of Përmet held the monopoly in the trade of opinga in the vilayets of Shkodër and Janina until 1841, when that privilege was revoked under the Tanzimat reforms.

See also
Opanak
Culture of Albania
Albanian traditional clothing
Qeleshe
Xhamadan

References

Albanian clothing
Shoes
Folk footwear
Illyrian Albania